Calochroa hamiltoniana is a species of tiger beetle endemic to the southern Western Ghats of India. It is found only on the shaded floor of dense and moist forests. It is 14 to 17 mm long and has the pronotum and elytra largely greenish or bronze with an orange and black stripe running along the length of the elytra.

References 

Cicindelidae
Endemic arthropods of India